Punta Baretti (4,013 m) is a mountain in the Mont Blanc Massif in the Val d'Aosta, Italy.

See also

List of 4000 metre peaks of the Alps

Alpine four-thousanders
Mountains of Aosta Valley
Mountains of the Alps